Kalana is a village in Hiiumaa Parish, Hiiu County in northwestern Estonia. It is located at the end of the Kõpu Peninsula, part of the island of Hiiumaa. Kalana has a population of 29 (as of 1 February 2011).
It is also known as Dagerort (Дагерорт) in Swedish and Russian.

The village is first mentioned in 1531 (Vischorde); first Estonian-language mentioning is in 1798 (Kallana). Historically, the village was part of Kõrgessaare Manor, and Kõpu Manor.

The westernmost part of the village is Ristna or Ristna nina (()).

Gallery

References

Villages in Hiiu County
Populated coastal places in Estonia